Rahmaniyeh-ye Feysali (also Romanized as Raḩmānīyeh-ye Feyşalī; also known as Raḩmānī, Raḩmānī-ye do, Raḩmānī-ye Feyşalī, Raḩmānīyeh, and Raḩmānī-ye Qadīm) is a village in Gharb-e Karun Rural District, in the Central District of Khorramshahr County, Khuzestan Province, Iran. At the 2006 census, its population was 387, in 56 families.

References 

Populated places in Khorramshahr County